Alex Douglas Pires da Silva (born 7 May 1990) was a silver medalist in Athletics at the 2020 Summer Paralympics – Men's marathon T46. He is a past winner of the 2017 London Marathon for T46 athletes. He has a congenital limb deficiency.

References

External links 
 
 

1990 births
Living people
Brazilian male marathon runners
Paralympic athletes of Brazil
Paralympic silver medalists for Brazil
Paralympic medalists in athletics (track and field)
Medalists at the 2020 Summer Paralympics
20th-century Brazilian people
21st-century Brazilian people